Justus is the eleventh studio album by the Monkees.  The album was recorded in celebration of their 30th anniversary and released on October 15, 1996. It features the return of Michael Nesmith to the group.

Background
Justus was the first Monkees album since Head was released in 1968 to feature all four Monkees. It was also the final studio album to feature contemporary recordings of Davy Jones before his death in 2012. Although Nesmith sang lead vocals only on a remake of the 1968 song "Circle Sky", he did write the Dolenz-vocal song, "Admiral Mike", and provided background vocals for all tracks.

Although preliminary work on the album was begun using songs from various writers, upon Nesmith's agreement to join the production it was agreed that all songs would be written only by the four members of the group. The four also produced and recorded all the tracks jointly, making it the first Monkees album since Headquarters to be produced entirely by the group as a single unit, and the first album ever to be recorded by the foursome alone. A video was also produced to promote the album.

"Circle Sky" is a remake from the Head soundtrack, with new lyrics from Nesmith. "You and I" is a different song from the song with the same name on Instant Replay. It originally appeared on a 1976 album, Dolenz, Jones, Boyce & Hart, recorded during a reunion of Jones and Dolenz with Tommy Boyce and Bobby Hart, who were the band's first writers and producers.

A different version of "It's Not too Late" appears on Jones's solo album Just for the Record, Vol. 4.

The title is pronounced as either "Justice" or "Just Us", the latter implying that only the four Monkees perform on the album.

The tracks "Circle Sky", "You and I" and "Regional Girl" were promoted, with music videos, in the 1997 television special Hey, Hey, It's the Monkees. These songs, along with "Oh, What a Night", were performed as part of the 30th anniversary reunion tour.

While all four members of the Monkees receive producer's credit, Nesmith ultimately produced and mixed the project while the other three Monkees toured.

Track listing

Personnel
 Micky Dolenz – drums, percussion, vocals
 Peter Tork – bass guitar, keyboards, percussion, vocals
 Davy Jones – percussion, acoustic guitar, vocals
 Michael Nesmith – guitars, percussion, vocals
 Arranged and produced by The Monkees
 Engineered by Bob Bullock and Michael McDonald, with assistance from Terry Bates, Gary McGrath, Grant Greene, and Steve Mixdorf
 Mixed by Michael McDonald, with assistance from Tim Gerron
 Mastered by Michael McDonald

References

1996 albums
The Monkees albums
Rhino Records albums